The 1970 Cal State Fullerton Titans football team represented California State College at Fullerton—now known as California State University, Fullerton—as a member of the California Collegiate Athletic Association (CCAA) during the 1970 NCAA College Division football season. Led by first-year head coach Dick Coury, Cal State Fullerton compiled an overall record of 6–4–1 with a mark of 3–1 in conference play, placing second in the CCAA. The Titans played home games at Anaheim Stadium in Anaheim, California.

Schedule

References

Cal State Fullerton
Cal State Fullerton Titans football seasons
Cal State Fullerton Titans football